Presença de Anita is a 2001 Brazilian drama television miniseries based on the 1948 novel of the same name by Mário Donato. Directed by Ricardo Waddington and Alexandre Avancini, the series aired on Rede Globo from 7 to 31 August 2001, consisting of 16 episodes.

It is a story about obsession, seduction, and death, centering around an 18-year-old Lolita-type girl named Anita, and a 45-year-old family man, Fernando. The miniseries stars Mel Lisboa and José Mayer as the main characters. Lisboa, who was 19 at the time, had her acting debut in this series, playing her most famous role to date.

Synopsis 
The plot begins with a couple, Lucia Helena (Helena Ranaldi) and Fernando (José Mayer), who are going through a marital crisis. He is an architect with literary aspirations who wants to finish his first book. She is a woman whose main concern is rescuing the love of her husband and saving her marriage. They live in the urban chaos of São Paulo. Lucia Helena decides to invest in a trip with the family, her son Luiz, and her stepdaughter Luiza (Júlia Almeida), to her hometown Florence, in the state of São Paulo, where the family gathers for Christmas and New Year.

In order to save her marriage, Lucia tries to please her husband by accepting his rages, encouraging his literary projects, and participating in his fantasies. Fernando wants to enjoy the end of the year by pursuing an old dream: to write a novel. In search of inspiration, he ends up finding Anita (Mel Lisboa), the ideal character for his novel.

Anita moves into a house where a crime of passion had occurred in the past. Anita lives in the most intense way, luring Fernando and awakening the first passion of Zezinho (Leonardo Miggiorin), a boy who lives across the way. Thus, she ends up forming a love triangle that forever changes the lives of everyone involved.

Cast 
 Mel Lisboa as Anita / Cíntia Ribeiro
 José Mayer as Fernando Reis (Nando)
 Helena Ranaldi as Lúcia Helena Reis
 Leonardo Miggiorin as José (Zezinho)
 Vera Holtz as Marta
 Carolina Kasting as Julieta
 Lineu Dias as Venancio
 Júlia Almeida as Luisa
 Taigu Nazareth as Andrés
 Clarisse Abujamra as Cecília
 Alexandre Barros as Hector Piña
 Daisy Braga as Claudia
 Walter Breda as Antonio
 Briani as Celeste

International broadcasts
 - Panamericana Televisión - 2002

 - Televisión Nacional de Chile - 2003, 2006

 - RCN Televisión - 2003

 - Teleantillas

 - Sistema Nacional de Televisión - 2004

References

External links 
 

2000s drama television series
2001 Brazilian television series debuts
2001 Brazilian television series endings
Brazilian drama television series
Brazilian television miniseries
Portuguese-language television shows
Rede Globo original programming
Television shows based on Brazilian novels